Esbjerg Airport  is a small airport located 5 nautical miles (9.2 km) northeast of Esbjerg, Denmark. The airport was opened on April 4, 1971. The primary use of Esbjerg Airport is as a heliport for flying offshore out to the North Sea oil and gas platforms.

Airlines and destinations

The following airlines operate regular scheduled and charter flights at the airport:

Statistics

See also
 List of the largest airports in the Nordic countries

References

AIP Denmark: Esbjerg - EKEB
VFR Flight Guide Denmark: Esbjerg - EKEB

External links

Official website

Airports in Denmark
Transport in Esbjerg
Buildings and structures in Esbjerg Municipality
International airports in Denmark